The Shin Kong Group is a large enterprise group in Taiwan, the group traces its origin back to the establishment of the Shin Kong Store in 1945 by group founder . The Shin Kong Store was engaged in the trading of fabrics and the import and export of sugar and tea. Wu created the name "Shin Kong" from the first Chinese character in the name Hsinchu, the city where he was born, and the first character in the given name of his business benefactor .

In 1986, Eugene Wu assumed chairmanship of the group. The group subsequently established  in 1992 and completed the landmark Shin Kong Life Tower in Taipei the following year. Since then, Shin Kong has steadily diversified and grown to become an integrated business with operations covering the financial, security, manufacturing, consumer, medical, and philanthropy sectors.

Shin Kong Financial Holding Co., Ltd. (SKFH) was founded as a publicly listed company in 2002. Through its subsidiaries Shin Kong Life Insurance, Shin Kong Bank, MasterLink Securities, Shin Kong Investment Trust, Shin Kong Property Insurance Agency, and Shin Kong Venture Capital, the company provides financial instruments.

 Financial Services
{|
| valign="top" |
Shin Kong Financial Holding()
Shin Kong Life Insurance
Shin Kong-HNA Life Insurance
 Taiwan Shin Kong Commercial Bank
 MasterLink Securities
 Shin Kong Investment Trust
 Shin Kong Property Insurance Agency
 Shin Kong Venture Capital 
Shinkong Insurance
|}

 Security Services
{| 
| valign="top" |
Taiwan Shin Kong Security()
Shin Kong Life Real Estate Service Company
|}

 Manufacturing
{| 
| valign="top" |
Shinkong Textile
Shinkong Synthetic Fibers
|}

 Consumer Services'''
{|
| valign="top" |
The Great Taipei Gas
Shin Hai Gas
Shin Kong Chao Feng
Shin Kong Mitsukoshi Department Store
 Shin Kong Construction & Development
|}

 Medical, Philanthropic and Public Services
{| 
| valign="top" |
Shin Kong Wu Ho-Su Memorial Hospital
Shin Kong Medical Club
Shin Kong Shien Ya International
Shin Kong Life Insurance Scholarship Foundation
Shin Kong Life Foundation
Shin Kong Wu Foundation
Shin Kong Wu Ho-Su Rescue Foundation
Shin Kong Wu Ho-Su Culture and Education Foundation
Shin Kong Bank Education Foundation
|}

2002 establishments in Taiwan
Companies based in Taipei
Companies formerly listed on the London Stock Exchange